Glen Shigeru Fukushima (born 1949) is a third-generation American of Japanese ancestry who has worked in academia, journalism, law, government, business, and in the nonprofit sector. Since September 2012, he has been a senior fellow at the Center for American Progress in Washington, D.C. In April 2022, he was confirmed by the U.S. Senate to serve as vice chairman of the Securities Investor Protection Corporation following his appointment by President Joe Biden.

Fukushima was widely suggested as a potential U.S. Ambassador to Japan in 2020 due to his extensive experience in U.S.-Japan relations.

In 2022, Fukushima made the largest single private  donations in history to the Fulbright Program establishing the Fulbright-Glen S. Fukushima Fund to expand study and research opportunities for Japanese and Americans.

Fukushima has been a member of the Council on Foreign Relations since 1993.

Early life and upbringing 
A California native, Fukushima was raised as an Army brat in California and Japan living in U.S. military bases including Camp Sendai, Washington Heights, and Camp Zama.

He attended elementary school in the northern California town of Monterey and in San Francisco. He attended Zama American High School in Japan and high school in southern California (Gardena).

Education 
A native of California, Fukushima's undergraduate education was at Deep Springs College and later Stanford University. He completed an exchange year at Keio University in Tokyo during the 1971–1972 school year.

After completing undergrad, Fukushima worked in Tokyo from 1972 to 1974 working for the The Asahi Shimbun and the Law Firm of Hamada and Yanagida. He also studied at the University of Tokyo while living in Japan.

Fukushima returned to the United States in 1974 and was a graduate and professional student at Harvard University from 1974 to 1982. While at Harvard, he earned a M.A. in Regional Studies—East Asia. He also was awarded a J.D. degree and an MBA. While at Harvard, Fukushima lectured as an assistant to influential Japanologists Ezra Vogel and Edwin Reischauer. He was a contemporary of Francis Fukuyama.

Among Fukushima's academic distinctions at Harvard was a National Science Foundation fellowship, a Fulbright Fellowship, and a Japan Foundation fellowship completed at the University of Tokyo.

Career 
After departing Harvard, Fukushima began his career as an associate at the law firm of Paul, Hastings, Janofsky & Walker (now Paul Hastings) in Los Angeles from 1982 to 1985.

United States Trade Representative 
Fukushima served as Deputy Assistant United States Trade Representative for Japan and China from 1988 to 1990. Prior to that, he served as Director for Japanese Affairs (1985–1988) at the Office of the United States Trade Representative (USTR). During his time at USTR, Fukushima gained a reputation as one of the most effective trade negotiators between the US and Japan.

He was largely responsible for the success in opening Japanese markets to US products and services during that period. In a notable anecdote, a memo he wrote (Repairing the U.S.-Japan Relationship, January 4, 1994) ended up on the desk of U.S. President Bill Clinton. Clinton added favorable annotations and circulated it widely, along with other memos he received that day.

Private sector work in Japan 
After leaving government, Fukushima was a senior business executive based in Asia from 1990 to 2012. He entered the Japanese corporate world as Vice President of AT&T Japan. He served as president of Arthur D. Little Japan, President & CEO of NCR Japan, and  President & CEO of Airbus Japan from 2005 to 2010, followed by a stint as its chairman and director from 2010 to 2012.

Center for American Progress 
Since September 2012, Fukushima has been a senior fellow at the Center for American Progress.

Securities Investor Protection Corporation 
In 2022, President Joe Biden appointed Fukushima vice chairman of the Securities Investor Protection Corporation (SIPC). The SIPC is a nonprofit established by Congress to assist investors in the case of the failure of a brokerage firm. It is led by a board with seven members, five appointed by the President and confirmed by the Senate, and two named by the U.S. Treasury and the Federal Reserve, each serving a term of three years.

Nonprofit work and corporate boards 
Fukushima has served on numerous corporate, nonprofit, and government advisory councils in the United States, Japan, and Europe. He is a member of the Council on Foreign Relations, Tokyo Club, and Tokyo Rotary Club. He is a prior vice chair of the Japan-U.S. Friendship Commission and the U.S. panel of Joint Committee on U.S.-Japan Cultural and Educational Interchange (CULCON). He was also a member of Hillary Clinton's Asia Policy Working Group and cofounded the Coalition of Asian Pacific Americans for the 21st Century (CAPA21) in 2014.

Fukushima has served on the board of various nonprofits in the United States and in Japan, including the Japan Association of Corporate Executives and the America-Japan Society. Fukushima has also served on numerous corporate boards. Some of the most notable include the Industrial Bank of Japan, Daiwa Securities Group, Mizuho Financial Group, INNOTECH, Nissho Iwai, and Fidelity International.

He is a past president as well as VP and board member of the American Chamber of Commerce in Japan.

References

External links 
 

1949 births
Zama American High School alumni
Gardena High School alumni
Deep Springs College alumni
Harvard Law School alumni
Living people
Stanford University alumni
American people of Japanese descent
20th-century American businesspeople